Ron Weaver was a college football player for the University of Texas. Weaver, who played under the alias Joel Ron McKelvey, played under his own name when he enrolled at Monterey Peninsula College in the fall of 1984. He played at Sacramento State in 1988 as a wide receiver. Hence, Weaver had already used up his NCAA eligibility by 1989.  After graduation, Weaver failed tryouts with the British Columbia Lions of the Canadian Football League and with the Houston Oilers since he was deemed to be neither fast enough (he ran only 4.6 in the 40-yard dash) nor strong enough (he could only bench press 250 pounds) to be viable in the pros.

Weaver was able to pull off his scam by enrolling at Los Angeles Pierce College under an assumed name and a different date of birth, using the name and Social Security number of a friend who had never played sports. Changing positions to cornerback, he played two seasons at Pierce before transferring to Texas, where he was recruited by the defensive backs coach and claimed his age was 23 instead of 30. Weaver also joined the team after photos had already been taken for the team media guide. He eventually received a full scholarship.

Reportedly, Weaver was not caught until he told a reporter that he planned to write a book about his scheme. He was not exposed until the day before the December 1995 Sugar Bowl, when The Salinas Californian, acting on an anonymous tip, revealed his real name and age.  A promise to produce a birth certificate came to nothing, and he disappeared shortly before the game.  The Longhorns lost to Virginia Tech; several players later said they were badly shaken by the discovery that one of their teammates was an imposter.

Coach John Mackovic and other officials claimed to know nothing of Weaver's fraud until he was caught.  Despite some initial concerns, there was no danger of Texas having to forfeit any games in which he played, as he had no impact on their outcome.  Ultimately, the NCAA cleared Texas of wrongdoing, accepting school officials' contention that they did not know and could not have known of Weaver's fraud. , this is the last known case of someone fraudulently playing NCAA Division I football.

After the story broke, Weaver's sister, Bonita Money, a television and film producer, said she was flooded with offers for her brother to sell the rights to his story. Bonita entered into a film deal with Addis-Wexler, Leonardo DiCaprio's management team a month after the scandal broke. Weaver and his sister had to cancel the deal once the Feds threatened to indict them for conspiracy if they completed a book or movie deal.

Weaver ultimately pleaded guilty in a California federal court to misusing a Social Security number; he did not serve any jail time.

Weaver's sister, Bonita Money, later became known as a minor actress who got into a 1992 fight with Shannen Doherty and was girlfriend to boxing legend and world champion Hector Camacho.

References

Texas Longhorns football players
Hoaxes in the United States
Living people
Los Angeles Pierce College people
American people convicted of fraud
Monterey Peninsula Lobos football players
College football controversies
Year of birth missing (living people)